Oleg Kharytonov (born 8 February 1988) is a Ukrainian sprint canoeist who has competed since the late 2000s. He won a silver medal in the K-1 200 m event at the 2009 ICF Canoe Sprint World Championships in Dartmouth.

References
 Canoe09.ca profile 

1988 births
Living people
Ukrainian male canoeists
ICF Canoe Sprint World Championships medalists in kayak
21st-century Ukrainian people